Expert's Opinion is a 1935 British thriller film directed by Ivar Campbell and starring Lucille Lisle, Leslie Perrins and Franklyn Bellamy. A group of foreign spies attempt to steal the plans for a new weapon.

It was made at Elstree Studios as a quota quickie for release by the British subsidiary of Paramount Pictures.

Cast
 Lucille Lisle as Marian Steele 
 Leslie Perrins as Richard Steele 
 Molly Fisher as Kay Frost 
 Franklyn Bellamy as Keller 
 Kim Peacock as Desmond Carter 
 John Kevan as Jay Frost 
 Lawrence Hanray as Coroner

References

Bibliography
 Chibnall, Steve. Quota Quickies: The Birth of the British 'B' Film. British Film Institute, 2007.
 Low, Rachael. Filmmaking in 1930s Britain. George Allen & Unwin, 1985.
 Wood, Linda. British Films, 1927-1939. British Film Institute, 1986.

External links

1935 films
British thriller films
British black-and-white films
1930s thriller films
Films directed by Ivar Campbell
Films produced by Anthony Havelock-Allan
British and Dominions Studios films
Films shot at Imperial Studios, Elstree
Paramount Pictures films
Films set in England
Quota quickies
1935 comedy films
1930s English-language films
1930s British films